Oinochori (meaning "village of wine", before 1927: Άνω Κάνιανη - Ano Kaniani) is a small village (2011 population: 58) in the municipal unit of Gravia, Phocis, Greece.  It is located at an altitude of approximately 900 meters on the slope of Mount Oiti. Ruins just outside the village are thought to be from the Dorian or pre-Dorian city of Dryopis.

External links
www.fokida.gr Brief information on the municipal unit of Gravia 
population information
www.gravia.gov.gr Information about Oinochori

References

Populated places in Phocis